This list is of the Cultural Properties of Japan designated in the category of  for the Prefecture of Kagoshima.

National Cultural Properties
As of 1 August 2015, six Important Cultural Properties have been designated, being of national significance.

Prefectural Cultural Properties
As of 1 April 2015, five properties have been designated at a prefectural level.

Municipal Cultural Properties
As of 1 April 2015, one hundred and forty-six properties have been designated at a prefectural level.

See also
 Cultural Properties of Japan
 List of Historic Sites of Japan (Kagoshima)
 Ōsumi Province, Satsuma Province
 List of National Treasures of Japan (historical materials)

References

External links
  Cultural Properties in Kagoshima Prefecture
  List of National and Prefectural Cultural Properties in Kagoshima Prefecture

Cultural Properties,historical materials
Historical materials,Kagoshima